Portrait of a Chameleon is the third studio album by American singer-songwriter and American Idol sixth season runner-up Blake Lewis. It was released on May 20, 2014. Its first single, "Your Touch" was released on February 26, 2013.

Track listing

Release history

References

2014 albums
Blake Lewis albums